Emy Legault (born April 5, 1996) is a Canadian triathlete from L'Île-Perrot, Quebec.

Career
Legault made her debut 2015 World Triathlon Cup in Montérégie, finishing in 55th.

As part of the 2022 World Triathlon Cup, Legault won a silver medal in the stop in Huatulco, Mexico. In July 2022, Legault posted a tenth place finish in the World Triathlon Championship Series stop in Hamburg, Germany, a career best finish in a World Triathlon Championship Series event. 

On June 30, 2022 Legault was named to Canada's 2022 Commonwealth Games team. She came 10th in the women's event.

References

External links
 

1996 births
Living people
Canadian female triathletes
21st-century Canadian women
Triathletes at the 2022 Commonwealth Games